Lookin' for a Love Again is the sixth studio album by American musician Bobby Womack. The album was released on January 11, 1974, by United Artists Records. The album reached #85 on the Billboard U.S. Pop Charts and #5 on the Billboard R&B Charts. It included the hit single "Lookin' for a Love", which charted No. 1 on the Billboard R&B Singles chart and #10 on the Billboard Hot 100.

Harry Womack and his other brothers are featured singing background vocals on the album, as they had with previous Bobby releases, and they re-sang their original 1962 hit when they were The Valentinos. Although Bobby had rehearsed the song, he wasn't going to feature it, but eventually went ahead at the insistence of one of his musicians.

Track listing
All tracks composed by Bobby Womack; except where indicated

Personnel
Bobby Womack - guitar, vocals, string arrangements
Rhino Rheinardt, Tippy Armstrong - guitar
Pete Carr, Lead Guitar
Jimmy Johnson - rhythm guitar
David Hood - bass
Barry Beckett - Electric Piano, Piano, Moog
Clayton Ivey - Organ, Clavichord
Truman Thomas - Electric Piano, Clavichord
Roger Hawkins - drums
Friendly Womack, Jr., Curtis Womack, Cecil Womack, Harry Womack - background vocals
René Hall - string arrangements
 Muscle Shoals Horn Section - horns
Technical
Gregg Hamm, Jerry Masters, Karat Faye - engineer
John Kehe, Ria Lewerke - design

Charts

Singles

References

1974 albums
Bobby Womack albums
United Artists Records albums
Albums arranged by René Hall
Albums produced by Bobby Womack